On 22 July 2013, a series of earthquakes occurred in Dingxi, Gansu. The first quake struck at 07:45 China Standard Time with an epicenter located at the border of Min County and Zhang County. It was measured at  5.9 by the United States Geological Survey (USGS) and  6.0 by the European Alert System. Another strong quake occurred about one hour later, measuring 5.6 magnitude by the USGS. As of 18:00 CST (10:00 UTC), 22 July 2013, 422 aftershocks had been recorded. The earthquakes were also felt in the nearby cities of Tianshui and Lanzhou in Gansu, as well as Xi'an, Baoji, and Xianyang in neighbouring Shaanxi.

As of 23:00 CST, 23 July 2013, the earthquakes had caused at least 95 deaths, and more than 2,300 people were injured.

Background
Since recorded history 25 earthquakes of more than 5.0 magnitude have occurred within a  radius from the current epicenter, the earliest being the 193 BC Lintao earthquake which measured at 6.5 magnitude, while the strongest was the 8.0-magnitude 1654 Tianshui earthquake.

Effects

According to the Gansu provincial officials, more than 1,200 buildings have collapsed and over 21,000 severely damaged. Many local buildings, often crudely constructed, were buried in the landslides caused by the earthquakes. Within the disaster zone, 20% of the buildings have collapsed and 60% are damaged. 27,360 people are estimated to have been displaced in Zhang County alone.

Communication was cut off to 13 townships in Zhang County and many villages in Meichuan, Min County. Five towns in eastern Min County have lost power.

Aftershocks

(Source:)

Relief efforts
On the day of the earthquakes, General-secretary of CCP and Chinese President Xi Jinping ordered "all-out rescue efforts". By afternoon the two top leaders of Gansu Province, Communist Party secretary Wang Sanyun and Governor Liu Weiping, along with 1,800 police officers and local officials, had arrived in the earthquake-stricken area. The People's Liberation Army's Lanzhou Military Region, which is headquartered  from the disaster zone, had sent 1,078 troops to join the relief efforts by mid-afternoon.

See also

 List of earthquakes in 2013
 List of earthquakes in China

References

External links

earthquakes
China
Dingxi
Earthquakes in Gansu
Earthquake clusters, swarms, and sequences
July 2013 events in China